The Brandsen rail disaster occurred on March 8, 1981, in Brandsen, a town in Buenos Aires Province in Argentina, when a passenger train carrying 803 passengers collided head-on with a freight train, killing 34 and injuring another 74. The train crash was caused by points failure.

It is considered one of the worst tragedies in the history of rail transport in Argentina. The Brandsen disaster was also the second accident involving a Luciérnaga long-distance service in Brandsen Partido after the Altamirano rail disaster occurred in 1964.

Overview 

The accident occurred at 4:30 on March 8, 1981, when a passenger train named La Luciérnaga ("the firefly") operated by state-owned Ferrocarriles Argentinos that had departed from Mar del Plata Station on March 7 at 23:55, ran on General Roca Railway tracks to Constitución Station in Buenos Aires with 803 passengers on board. The train ran at a speed of 120 km/h. On the other hand, a freight train transporting oil was stopped on km. 69 after derailing on the opposite track. Nevertheless, the derailing caused a tank fell on the track where the Luciérnaga ran.

The Luciérnaga entered to a curve near the bridge over Samborombón River. Due to the high speed, the passenger train could not stop on time, crashing the tank railcar that was on the track. Due to the strong impact, the diesel locomotive overturned while the wagons were stacked upon each other. The crash caused the death of 34 people and 74 injured.

Victims were taken to Brandsen, La Plata, Mar del Plata, Chascomús, and Buenos Aires. Several eyewitnesses told that the driver of the freight train ran away when he saw the Luciérnaga coming, saving his life after his failed attempts to warn the driver of the passenger train.

According to the train driver, it would have needed at least 1,000 meters of distance to stop the train. The line to Mar del Plata was interrupted during several days due to some wagons could not be removed from the place of the accident. It was determined that the derailment was caused by the break of an axle. A white cross placed alongside PR 29 commemorates the tragedy.

References

Railway accidents in 1981
Train collisions in Argentina
1981 in Argentina
History of Buenos Aires Province
March 1981 events in South America
Rail transport in Buenos Aires Province
1981 disasters in Argentina